Arandis Airport  is an airport serving Arandis, a town in the Erongo Region of Namibia. The town and airport also provide service to the Rössing Uranium Mine, one of the world's largest open-pit uranium mines.

See also
List of airports in Namibia
Transport in Namibia

References

External links
OpenStreetMap - Arandis
OurAirports - Arandis

Airports in Namibia
Buildings and structures in Erongo Region